1910 Mikhailov, provisional designation , is a carbonaceous asteroid from the outer regions of the asteroid belt, approximately  in diameter. Discovered at Nauchnyj in 1972, it was named after Russian astronomer Aleksandr Aleksandrovich Mikhailov. It has a 3:1 ratio of iron to carbon, hence the name. The asteroid is believed to have been expelled from its parent asteroid belt (one of three main asteroid belts in the inner Solar System), and is classified as a metallic asteroid, because its iron is fairly weak.

Discovery 

Mikhailov was discovered on 8 October 1972, by Ukrainian astronomer Lyudmila Zhuravleva at the Crimean Astrophysical Observatory in Nauchnyj, on the Crimean peninsula.

Zhuravleva is ranked 61 in Harvard's ranking of those who discovered minor planets. Detween 1972 and 1992, She discovered 200 such bodies, 13 of which were co-discoveries.

Orbit and classification 

The C-type asteroid is a non-family asteroid that belongs to the background population of the main belt. It orbits the Sun in the outer asteroid belt at a distance of 2.9–3.2 AU once every 5 years and 4 months (1,939 days; semi-major axis of 3.04 AU). Its orbit has an eccentricity of 0.05 and an inclination of 10° with respect to the ecliptic.

Physical characteristics 

It has a rotation period of 8.88 hours and a low geometric albedo of 0.05.

Naming 

The asteroid was named in honor of prominent Russian astronomer Aleksandr Aleksandrovich Mikhailov (1888–1983), a gravimetrist and academician, who was vice-president of the International Astronomical Union, director of the Pulkovo Observatory, a member of the Soviet Academy of Sciences and president of its Astronomical Council. The official  was published by the Minor Planet Center on 20 February 1976.

References

External links 
 Asteroid Lightcurve Database (LCDB), (query form)
 Dictionary of Minor Planet Names, Google books
 
 

001910
Discoveries by Lyudmila Zhuravleva
Named minor planets
19721008